The 1981 Eastern Michigan Hurons football team represented Eastern Michigan University in the 1981 NCAA Division I-A football season. In their fourth season under head coach Mike Stock, the Hurons compiled a 0–11 record (0–9 against conference opponents), finished in last place in the Mid-American Conference, and were outscored by their opponents, 338 to 88. The team's statistical leaders included J.F. Green with 1,391 passing yards, Ricky Calhoun with 971 rushing yards, and Jeff Dackin with 440 receiving yards.

Schedule

References

Eastern Michigan
Eastern Michigan Eagles football seasons
Eastern Michigan Hurons football
College football winless seasons